Chinwe Okoro (born 20 June 1989) is a Nigerian track and field athlete who competes in the shot put and the discus throw.

Career
Okoro grew up in Kentucky, attending high school in Russell, and holds dual Nigerian-American citizenship. She attended the University of Louisville and combined athletics and academics as a student-athlete. She won the American junior title in the shot put in 2008 and was an NCAA All-American in 2011. Her high marks in her physical therapy studies made her a five-time Big East Conference All-Academic, and she later won the Michael Hale Scholarship to continue with her studies via a doctorate at Bellarmine University.

Her first international competition came at the 2008 World Junior Championships in Athletics, where she finished tenth in the shot put. Her first senior medals followed at the 2012 African Championships in Athletics, where she won the discus throw and was runner-up to Vivian Chukwuemeka in the shot put in a Nigerian medal sweep. Chukwuemeka was later disqualified for doping, however, elevating Okoro to double throws champion at the event.

She was again runner-up in the shot put, with Cameroon's Auriol Dongmo Mekemnang being the women's champion on that occasion. She represented Africa in both throws events at the 2014 IAAF Continental Cup, held a month later at the same venue in Marrakesh, and was sixth in shot put and seventh in discus.

Okoro qualified for the 2016 Rio Olympics with a throw of 61.58. She represented Nigeria in the discus throw and finished 14th out of 34.

Personal bests
Shot put:  (2012)
Discus throw:  (2016)

International competitions

References

External links

Interview with Athletics Africa

Living people
1989 births
Sportspeople from Kentucky
Nigerian female shot putters
Nigerian female discus throwers
Louisville Cardinals women's track and field athletes
Bellarmine University alumni
American sportspeople of Nigerian descent
Athletes (track and field) at the 2016 Summer Olympics
Olympic athletes of Nigeria
21st-century Nigerian women